Plasmodium brygooi is a parasite of the genus Plasmodium subgenus Lacertamoeba. 

Like all Plasmodium species P. brygooi has both vertebrate and insect hosts. The vertebrate hosts for this parasite are lizards.

Description 

This species was first described by Telford and Landau in 1987.

Etymology
The name of the species refers to Édouard-Raoul Brygoo, a French parasitologist.

Geographical occurrence 

This species is found in Madagascar.

Clinical features and host pathology 

The only known host is the chameleon (Chamaeleo brevicornis).

References 

brygooi